The 2021 Arab Athletics Championships was the twenty second edition of the international athletics competition between Arab countries that took place from 16 to 20 June 2021 at Rades Athletic Stadium in Radès, close to Tunis, the capital of Tunisia. Around 400 athletes from 18 nations attended the event.

Medal summary

Men

Women

Medal table
Key

References

Results. Retrieved on 2021-06-17.
Results on  Worldathletics

Arab Athletics Championships
International athletics competitions hosted by Tunisia
Arab Athletics Championships
Arab Athletics Championships
Sports competitions in Radès
June 2021 sports events in Africa
21st century in Radès